Mount Zion is a foothill on the eastern flank of the Front Range of the Rocky Mountains of North America.  The  peak is located in Windy Saddle Park, west (bearing 273°) of downtown Golden in Jefferson County, Colorado, United States.

Tradition
One notable feature of Mount Zion is a white "M", maintained by the Colorado School of Mines.  All freshmen attending the school climb the mountain and each add a rock on the "M" which they can take with them when they graduate.  This is a tradition that has been going on since 1908 when the M was first created.  The "M" has been permanently lighted since 1932.

See also

List of Colorado mountain ranges
List of Colorado mountain summits
List of Colorado fourteeners
List of Colorado 4000 meter prominent summits
List of the most prominent summits of Colorado
List of Colorado county high points

References

External links

Zion
Zion
Zion
Golden, Colorado
Geoglyphs
Hill figures in the United States